The women's 100 metre freestyle event at the 1956 Olympic Games took place from 29 November to 1 December. This swimming event used freestyle swimming, which means that the method of the stroke is not regulated (unlike backstroke, breaststroke, and butterfly events). Nearly all swimmers use the front crawl or a variant of that stroke. Because an Olympic size swimming pool is 50 metres long, this race consisted of two lengths of the pool.

Records
Prior to this competition, the existing world and Olympic records were:

The following records were established during the competition:

Results

Heats

Semifinals

Final

Key: WR = World record

References

Women's freestyle 100 metre
1956 in women's swimming
Women's events at the 1956 Summer Olympics